The Shire of Leonora is a local government area in the Goldfields-Esperance region of Western Australia, about  north of the city of Kalgoorlie and about  northeast of the state capital, Perth.

History

Leonora was originally part of the North Coolgardie Road District when that entity was gazetted in 1898. The town of Leonora was gazetted as the Municipality of Leonora with its own mayor in 1900.

The Shire of Leonora originated from the Mount Malcolm Road District, which was established on 31 May 1912, when the North Coolgardie Road District was abolished and broken up into three separate road districts: Mount Malcolm, Kookynie and Menzies. (The North Coolgardie Road District had absorbed three municipalities in March 1912, including the Municipality of Malcolm; however, the amalgamation had not been successful.)

Mount Malcolm absorbed the Municipality of Leonora on 1 July 1917 and became the Leonora-Mount Malcolm Road District.

On 16 August 1929, a neighbouring district, the Lawlers Road District, was dissolved and split between Mount Margaret (later Laverton) and Leonora-Mount Malcolm. The Leonora-Mt-Malcolm Road District was renamed the Leonora Road District on 20 June 1930.

On 1 July 1961, it became the Shire of Leonora under the Local Government Act 1960, which reformed all remaining road districts into shires.

Wards
As of the 2003 election, the Shire is divided into two wards:

 North Ward (four councillors)
 South Ward (five councillors)

From 1979 until 2003, the Shire was divided into Leonora (3), Leinster (4) and Country (2) wards.

Towns and localities
The towns and localities of the Shire of Leonora with population and size figures based on the most recent Australian census:

Abandoned and ghost towns
Abandoned and ghost towns in the Shire of Leonora:
 Agnew
 Eulaminna
 Gwalia
 Kathleen
 Kurrajong
 Lawlers
 Malcolm
 Mertondale
 Murrin Murrin
 Vivien
 Woodarra
 Yundamindera (known as "The Granites")

Heritage-listed places

As of 2023, 95 places are heritage-listed in the Shire of Leonora, of which 47 are on the State Register of Heritage Places, the majority of those around the former mining town of Gwalia.

References

External links
 

Leonora